Be More Chill is a musical with original music and lyrics by Joe Iconis, and a book by Joe Tracz, based on the 2004 novel of the same name by Ned Vizzini. After a 2015 regional theatre production, the musical premiered off-Broadway in 2018. A Broadway production began previews on February 13, 2019, and officially opened on March 10, 2019. The Broadway production closed on August 11, 2019. An Off West End production opened on February 18, 2020 and temporarily closed on March 16, 2020, due to the ongoing COVID-19 pandemic with the production being cancelled on June 3, 2020. In 2021, it was announced that the production, featuring the original London cast, would resume performances on the West End at the Shaftesbury Theatre for a 10-week run starting June 30. A Chicago production was set to open in July 2020.

As of 2018, a film adaptation is in development.

Productions

Original New Jersey production 
The musical premiered on May 30, 2015 at the Two River Theater in Red Bank, New Jersey. It ran until June 28, 2015. The production was directed by Stephen Brackett and featured orchestrations by Charlie Rosen, music direction by Nathan Dame, and choreography by Chase Brock. It featured Will Connolly as Jeremy, Eric William Morris as The SQUIP (an acronym for "Super Quantum Unit Intel Processor"), George Salazar as Michael, and Stephanie Hsu as Christine, as well as Katie Ladner, Lauren Marcus, Jake Boyd, Gerard Canonico, Katlyn Carlson, and Paul Whitty. The musical was commissioned by Two River Theater in 2011 as part of their new play development program.

Original Off-Broadway production 
After mixed reviews in its out of town tryouts, the show did not receive another production. In early 2017, the show began to gain traction online. A cast recording of the original production entered Billboard Cast Album chart's Top 10 in July 2017. This led to the show getting an Off-Broadway production in 2018.

Be More Chill ran Off-Broadway at the Irene Diamond Stage at the Pershing Square Signature Center. It began previews July 26, 2018, officially opening on August 9, 2018. It was originally scheduled to close on September 23, 2018 but was given a one-week extension after selling out and closed on September 30, 2018. This production featured several original cast members including Hsu, Salazar, Canonico, Carlson, and Marcus reprising their respective roles. New cast members included Will Roland as Jeremy, Jason Tam as the SQUIP, Britton Smith as Jake, Tiffany Mann as Jenna, and Jason "Sweettooth" Williams as Mr. Heere. The production also added Emily Marshall as music director.

Original Broadway production 
On September 5, 2018 a Broadway production was announced. Preview performances at the Lyceum Theatre began on February 13, 2019 and the show officially opened on March 10, 2019. The Broadway transfer was estimated to cost $9.5 million according to lead producer Jerry Goehring. On December 18, 2018, it was announced that the entire Off-Broadway cast would reprise their roles for the Broadway production. Understudies and covers for the Broadway production featured Cameron Bond, Anthony Chatmon II, Morgan Siobhan Green, Troy Iwata, George Salazar, Talia Suskauer, and Joel Waggoner. The production announced its closing on June 20, 2019 and closed on August 11, 2019, playing 30 previews and 177 performances.

Original London production 
Be More Chill announced a London run on September 29, 2019. Previews began at The Other Palace on February 12, 2020, with an opening night set for February 18, 2020. On December 9, 2019, casting for the London production was announced, with Scott Folan as Jeremy, Blake Patrick Anderson as Michael, Miracle Chance as Christine, and Stewart Clarke as the SQUIP. Other cast members included Renée Lamb, Millie O'Connell, Eloise Davies, James Hameed, Miles Paloma, and Christopher Fry. Although the production was scheduled to close on June 14, 2020, it was announced on June 3 that all remaining performances of the show would be cancelled following its early closure on March 16, 2020, due to the COVID-19 pandemic.

West End Production
On May 14, 2021, it was announced that the production would transfer to London’s West End, resuming performances at the Shaftesbury Theatre for a 10-week run, with the original London cast reprising their roles. The show opened on June 30 and closed on September 5, 2021.

Original Chicago production 
On December 12, 2019, the show announced that it would open an 18-week limited engagement run in Chicago at the Apollo Theater. Previews were set to begin April 17, 2020, with an opening night set for April 26, 2020. However, because of the COVID-19 pandemic, the show's previews were postponed to July 7, 2020, and the opening night was moved to July 17, 2020. The lead role of Jeremy will be played by Liam Oh, while other cast members will include Jeremiah Alsop as Michael, Rebecca Hurd as Christine, Teresa LaGamba as Jenna, Michelle Lauto as Chloe, Eben K. Logan as Brooke, Billy Rude as Jake, Koray Tarhan as Rich, and Alex Goodrich as Mr. Heere/Mr. Reyes. The actor playing the role of the SQUIP is yet to be announced. Due to unforeseen circumstances Be More Chill announced that the production at the Apollo Theater have been cancelled.

Plot

Act One 
Jeremy Heere, a high school junior, is a social outcast. He lives with his recently widowed father, who works from home and makes Jeremy uncomfortable by refusing to wear pants in the house. At school, Jeremy is bullied by popular student Rich Goranski, who writes "boyf" on his backpack. His best friend, Michael Mell (on whose backpack Rich has written "riends"), tries to comfort Jeremy by telling him that being a loser is okay. Jeremy's long-time crush Christine Canigula signs up for the school play, which prompts him to do so as well. Jeremy wonders if someone can help him ("More Than Survive").

As they wait for the first play rehearsal to begin, Christine professes her love of theatre to Jeremy, because she can play different people and always knows what to say and performs ("I Love Play Rehearsal"). The drama teacher, Mr. Reyes, reveals that the school play will be A Midsummer Night's Dream set in a post-apocalyptic future, re-titled A Midsummer Nightmare (About Zombies). During rehearsal, Jake Dillinger, one of the popular boys, flirts with Christine, making Jeremy jealous ("More Than Survive (Reprise)").

Jeremy is confronted in the bathroom by Rich, who tells Jeremy how he managed his rise to popularity: as an unpopular freshman, he took a pill called a "Super Quantum Unit Intel Processor"—a "SQUIP"—containing a computer that implants itself inside the user's brain and tells the user what to do and say. Rich suggests that Jeremy buy one in order to become cooler ("The Squip Song").

While playing video games with Michael, Jeremy tells him about Rich's offer. After an awkward conversation with his dad (still not wearing pants), Jeremy decides to check the SQUIP out. Jeremy assures Michael that, no matter what happens, they'll always be a team ("Two-Player Game").

The two visit the mall to buy the SQUIP from a dealer at Payless ShoeSource. Jeremy, as instructed, swallows it with green Mountain Dew. When the SQUIP activates, it causes Jeremy to have a seizure in front of Christine and Jake ("The Squip Enters"). The SQUIP (in the guise of Keanu Reeves), criticizes Jeremy's appearance, personality, and behavior, telling him that everything about him is terrible ("Be More Chill, Pt. 1"). The SQUIP orders him to go to a store to buy a new Eminem shirt. Jeremy picks up a woman's shirt and encounters two popular girls from school, Brooke Lohst and Chloe Valentine, and the SQUIP helps Jeremy fabricate a story in order to create a connection with the two girls. They offer Jeremy a ride home ("Do You Wanna Ride?"), which the SQUIP demands he accept, but Jeremy declines because he does not wish to leave Michael in the mall. The girls leave, and the SQUIP lies to Jeremy and tells him that Michael has left the mall. It tells him that in order for its plan to improve his social standing to work, Jeremy needs to obey every order it gives him ("Be More Chill, Pt. 2").

The next day, Jeremy heads to school with renewed confidence, wondering if he might be less invisible than before. The SQUIP delves into the inner psyche of the student body around him, giving Jeremy insight on the fears and insecurities of his fellow peers. Jeremy's SQUIP syncs itself with Rich's, instantly making them friends. Jeremy heads confidently to the play rehearsal ("Sync Up"). Christine tells Jeremy about her feelings for a guy she knows, who Jeremy initially believes is himself, but who turns out to be Jake ("A Guy That I'd Kinda Be Into").

Afterward, the SQUIP informs Jeremy that Christine won't date him until his social standing drastically improves. Encouraging Jeremy to use an interested Brooke as a stepping stone to greater popularity, he hooks up with her, while Jake asks Christine to come to his house ("Upgrade"). Overwhelmed, Jeremy asks the SQUIP to shut itself off for a few minutes. Immediately, Jeremy sees Michael and is elated but Michael states that Jeremy has been ignoring him all day. The SQUIP explains that it was using "optic nerve blocking" to block Michael from Jeremy's vision and that in order to be more popular he has to "upgrade to Jeremy 2.0." Jeremy eventually decides he is tired of being a loser and turns on optic nerve blocking, leaving him alone with the SQUIP ("Loser Geek Whatever").

Act Two 

On Halloween, Jake hosts a large party that features alcohol and other shenanigans ("Halloween"). Christine arrives in her Juliet princess costume because of Jake's past compliment on it, hoping to please Jake, but he brushes her aside to party. Jeremy arrives to meet Brooke, but Chloe, who is jealous of Brooke, tries to seduce Jeremy. Jeremy is uncomfortable and tries to get away, but the SQUIP forces him to remain in the situation as it escalates to Chloe making out with Jeremy ("Do You Wanna Hang?"). Chloe also has Jeremy drink alcohol, causing the SQUIP to malfunction, and then feigns having sex with him, angering Jake and breaking Brooke's heart.

Fleeing from Jake and the girls, Jeremy runs into a bathroom, where he finds Michael, who has crashed the party. Michael tries to warn Jeremy of the dangers of the SQUIP, explaining that someone ended up in a mental hospital after they went crazy trying to get it out of their head. Jeremy accuses Michael of being jealous of his popularity and calls him a loser. Michael, devastated and angry, locks himself in the bathroom, where he has a panic attack and sensory overload as he mourns the loss of his best and only friend ("Michael in the Bathroom"). Jeremy talks to Christine without the SQUIP's help and he asks her out in a burst of confidence ("A Guy That I'd Kinda Be Into (Reprise)"). Christine, who has found herself in an existential crisis after breaking up with Jake, declines.

Meanwhile, Rich goes around the party frantically asking people for Mountain Dew Red. Jeremy's SQUIP finally reactivates and reviews the events of the night, prompting Jeremy to leave the party immediately. Rich, alone and desperate, talks to his SQUIP and then sets the house on fire. The next morning, Jenna Rolan, the school gossip, informs everyone that Rich had burned down Jake's house at the end of the party, sending Rich to the hospital and causing Jake to break both of his legs jumping out of a window while trying to escape. The news spreads throughout the school through text and tweeting ("The Smartphone Hour (Rich Set a Fire)").

At home, Jeremy is confronted by his father (still not wearing pants), who brings up Jeremy's new personality and change in attitude. Jeremy reprimands his father for his behavior since the divorce, calling him a loser as well. Shaken by Jeremy's words, Mr. Heere realizes that something is very wrong and that he must take charge. He tracks down Michael and asks him to not give up on his friend. Michael reluctantly agrees to help, on the condition that Mr. Heere puts on some pants and becomes a better father ("The Pants Song").

As the cast prepares for the play, Jeremy encounters Christine, who is shaken and upset about the fire. Jeremy is unhappy with the relationships he has damaged and angrily blames the SQUIP for his misfortunes. The SQUIP instead blames it on "human error" and tells Jeremy he can improve the lives of the rest of the students, and eventually the whole world, by providing them all with SQUIPs. In Rich's locker, Jeremy finds a box full of SQUIPs, which Jeremy then pours into a beaker of Mountain Dew ("The Pitiful Children").

Backstage during the play, Christine confronts Jeremy over his use of the SQUIP, causing him to doubt the plan. However, the SQUIP has already begun to take over others in the play. The SQUIP reveals its intention to sync the entire student body, and then the whole world. Jeremy comes to a realization: Mountain Dew activates the SQUIP, while Mountain Dew Red deactivates it. Michael reappears from the audience with a bottle of Mountain Dew Red, which he gives to Jeremy after making him apologize for his actions, but a SQUIPed Jake dumps most of it out. Jeremy and Michael fight off the controlled students until the SQUIP reveals that Christine has been SQUIPed, and under its influence, she professes her love for Jeremy. Jeremy, however, realizes this is not what he had wanted and makes Christine drink the last of the red Mountain Dew: this causes a chain reaction that destroys the rest of the SQUIPs ("The Play").

Jeremy wakes up in the hospital, sharing a room with Rich, who proudly comes out to Jeremy as bisexual and is ready to finally be who he really is. Michael visits Jeremy and the two reconcile, and Mr. Heere (finally wearing pants) visits Jeremy as well, informing him that he'll be a better dad. Surrounded by his friends and family, Jeremy realizes that there will always be outside influences, but he needs to learn to make up his own mind instead. He asks Christine out again, and she accepts, kissing him. The SQUIP reveals itself to still be alive, weakly taunting Jeremy from inside his head, but Jeremy ignores it, happily proclaiming that "of all the voices in my head, the loudest one is mine" ("Voices in My Head").

Musical numbers 
Source:

† – Indicates a song not included on the Cast Album

 Act 1
 "Jeremy's Theme" – Orchestra 
 "More Than Survive" – Jeremy, Michael & Ensemble
 "I Love Play Rehearsal" – Christine
 "More Than Survive (Reprise)" – Jeremy
 "The SQUIP Song" – Rich & Ensemble
 "The SQUIP Song (Reprise 1)" – Jeremy †
 "Two-Player Game" – Michael & Jeremy
 "The SQUIP Song (Reprise 2)" – Scary Stockboy †
 "The Squip Enters" – Orchestra
 "Be More Chill Pt. 1" – Squip, Jeremy & Mall People
 "Do You Wanna Ride?" – Brooke & Chloe
 "Be More Chill Pt. 2" – Squip, Jeremy & Mall People
 "Sync Up" – Jeremy, Squip, Jake, Rich, Chloe, Brooke, Jenna, Mr. Reyes & Ensemble
 "More Than Survive (Reprise 2)" – Jeremy, Squip & Ensemble
 "The SQUIP Lurks" – Orchestra
 "A Guy That I'd Kinda Be Into" – Christine, Jeremy, Squip & Ensemble
 "Upgrade" – Brooke, Squip, Jeremy, Jake, Christine & Ensemble
 "Loser Geek Whatever" – Jeremy

 Act 2
 "Halloween" – Brooke, Jake, Chloe, Rich, Jenna & Ensemble
 "Do You Wanna Hang?" – Chloe
 "Michael in the Bathroom" – Michael & Ensemble
 "A Guy That I’d Kinda Be Into (Reprise)" – Christine & Jeremy
 "The Smartphone Hour" – Jenna, Chloe, Brooke & Ensemble
 "The Pants Song" – Mr. Heere & Michael
 "The Pitiful Children" – Squip, Jeremy, Jenna & Ensemble
 "The Play" – Michael, Jake, Brooke, Chloe, Jeremy, Christine, Squip & Ensemble
 "Voices in My Head" – Mr. Heere, Michael, Rich, Jeremy, Jenna, Brooke, Chloe, Jake, Christine & Ensemble

Notes

Roles and original casts

Original productions
Source:

Recording
The world premiere cast recorded an original cast album on July 21, 2015, which was released on October 31, 2015. The album has since received over 350 million streams online. The cast recording was released on vinyl by Ghostlight Records in July 2018. A recording of the song, "Loser Geek Whatever" was released as a single on November 29, 2018. An original Broadway cast album was recorded in March 2019, and released on May 3, 2019.

Awards and honors

Original Off-Broadway production

Original Broadway production

Reception
Despite a strong fan following online, the show has received mixed reviews from critics. Terry Teachout of The Wall Street Journal wrote, "Be More Chill is one of the strongest new musicals of the past decade, a charming, astutely crafted tale of neurotic post-millennial geeks in love whose appeal is in no way limited to those whom it portrays."

Peter Travers of Rolling Stone Magazine wrote, "The audiences who made this show happen digitally are now making pilgrimages to the Lyceum Theater to see those songs done live by a talented young cast with enough juice to ignite every light on Broadway... By the time Jeremy belts out his final number, 'Voices in My Head,' you’ll be hearing those voices, too, in a wow of a musical that comes on like gangbusters."

Reviewing the Off-Broadway production, Ben Brantley of The New York Times called the show "the theatrical equivalent of one of those high-pitched dog whistles that only those under 25 can hear," and said that the show would have little to offer for that outside of its tween fandom, as well as criticizing the poor lyricism. He updated his review after seeing the Broadway production and said that even though the show's production values have increased since the Off-Broadway production, it remains "a festival of klutziness" and "the worst of the lot, with a repetitive score, painfully forced rhymes, cartoonish acting and a general approach that mistakes decibel level (literally and metaphorically) for emotional intensity."

On the other hand, A.D. Amorosi of Variety called the Off-Broadway production "a memorable thrill ride, a zealously caffeinated high school musical." Of the Broadway version, Amorosi wrote, "Traditional theatergoing audiences that tend to be older than the teens and twentysomethings that packed the Off-Broadway run will find delicious favor in Iconis’ contagious melodies and tricky lyrics...Be More Chill is Broadway's wiliest and socially savviest night out for teens and parents alike."

The Off-West End production received mostly positive reviews from critics. Arifa Akbar of The Guardian said the production was "gloriously like its own thing, filled with astute observation alongside delightfully silly humour and storming performances." Claire Allfree of The Telegraph called the production "a coming-of-age story with fabulous, catchy tunes."

Film adaptation
On October 20, 2018, four months before the show opened on Broadway, it was announced that Shawn Levy's 21 Laps Entertainment and Greg Berlanti's Berlanti Productions would partner to produce a film adaptation of the musical, with Joe Iconis serving as executive producer. 20th Century Studios, who acquired the rights prior to their acquisition by The Walt Disney Company, will distribute.

References

External links 
Be More Chill   website
Opening night in London coverage

2015 musicals
Musicals based on novels
Science fiction musicals
Off-Broadway musicals
Broadway musicals
Teen musicals